Paula Tomás Serer (born 11 September 2001) is a Spanish professional footballer who plays as a left back for Liga F club Levante UD and the Spain women's national team.

Club career
Tomás started her career at Levante C and progressed through to the senior team.

References

External links
Profile at La Liga

2001 births
Living people
Women's association football defenders
Spanish women's footballers
People from Marina Alta
Sportspeople from the Province of Alicante
Footballers from the Valencian Community
Levante UD Femenino players
Primera División (women) players
Segunda Federación (women) players